Ghost to a Ghost/Gutter Town is the sixth studio album by American musician Hank Williams III. The double album was released on September 6, 2011. All songs were recorded in Hank III’s home studio The Haunted Ranch. The album features guest appearances by Tom Waits, Ray Lawrence Jr., Eddie Pleasant (Hank III's merchandise and scheduling guy), Alan King (Hellstomper), Les Claypool (Primus), Dave Sherman (Wretched, Earthride), Troy Medlin (Sourvein), and Williams' dog Trooper. Ghost to a Ghost/Gutter Town consisted of two of the four albums Hank Williams III simultaneously released on September 6, 2011 on Hank 3 Records (hank3.com), with distribution through Megaforce Records. It is also Hank III’s first album to be released by Megaforce, after leaving Curb Records in 2010.

Track listing

Personnel
Hank Williams III – drums, acoustic guitar, vocals, keys, banjo
Andy Gibson – steel guitar, banjo
David McElfresh – fiddle, mandolin
Zach Shedd – double bass
Daniel Mason – banjo
Johnny Hiland – guitar
Billy Contreras – fiddle
Rory Hoffman – accordion

Chart performance

References

Hank Williams III albums
2011 albums
Megaforce Records albums